Calytrix gypsophila, commonly known as the gypsum fringle-myrtle, is a species of plant in the myrtle family Myrtaceae that is endemic to Western Australia.

It usually blooms between February to September producing white flowers. Inside a small ovoid seed sits in the long section of the fruit.

Found on plains, around salt lakes and on clay pans often with samphires in the Goldfields-Esperance region of Western Australia and into central and western South Australia where it grows on gypseous sand or loam soils.

The species was first formally described by the botanist Lyndley Craven in 1987 in the article A taxonomic revision of Calytrix Labill. (Myrtaceae) in the journal Brunonia.

References

Plants described in 1987
gypsophila
Flora of Western Australia
Flora of South Australia